The Russian Federation competed at the 2012 Summer Olympics in London, United Kingdom, from 27 July to 12 August 2012. This was the nation's fifth consecutive appearance at the Summer Olympics as an independent nation. The Russian Olympic Committee sent a total of 436 athletes to the Games, 208 men and 228 women, to compete in 24 sports. For the first time in its Olympic history, Russia was represented by more female than male athletes.

Russia left London with a total of 82 medals (24 gold, 27 silver, and 31 bronze), finishing fourth in the overall medal standings, but was later stripped of 16 medals (6 gold, 8 silver, 2 bronze) for doping violations. The 16 stripped medals are the most ever stripped from one nation at an Olympic Games. Most of the medals won by Russia were awarded to the team in gymnastics, wrestling, athletics, and boxing. Of the twenty-four sports played by the Russian athletes, at least a single Olympic medal was won in sixteen of them. Russian athletes dominated in rhythmic gymnastics and synchronized swimming, where they won gold medals in all the events. Nine Russian athletes won more than a single Olympic medal in London. Russia's team-sport athletes also proved successful at these games, as the men's volleyball and basketball teams won gold and bronze medals, respectively. For the first time in its history, Russia won Olympic gold medals in judo, winning three golds in the men's events. The success was attributed to an increased investment in the sport by the government and Vladimir Putin's personal interest.

Among the nation's medalists were Aliya Mustafina, who emerged as one of the most successful Russian gymnasts in history, with a total of four Olympic medals at a single games, and Maria Sharapova, who won silver in the women's tennis singles against United States' Serena Williams. Anastasia Davydova became the most successful synchronized swimmer in Olympic history, with a total of five gold medals, while her compatriots Natalia Ishchenko and Svetlana Romashina managed to win gold medals in both duet and team events. Olga Zabelinskaya became the first Russian female cyclist to win two Olympic medals in road events. Diver Ilya Zakharov recaptured Russia's success in his sport after 12 years, as he won its first ever gold medal in men's springboard. Rhythmic gymnast Evgeniya Kanaeva made history by becoming the first back-to-back Olympic champion in the individual all-around event, while the Russian group in rhythmic gymnastics defended their Olympic title for the fourth consecutive time in the group all-around.

Medalists

| width=78% align=left valign=top |

| width="22%" align="left" valign="top" |

Competitors
The Russian Olympic Committee selected a team of 436 athletes, 208 men and 228 women, to compete in all sports except field hockey and football; it was the nation's third-largest team sent to the Olympics, tying its record with Sydney in 2000. Athletics was the nation's largest team by sport, with a total of 104 competitors.

The Russian team featured 12 defending champions from Beijing, including pole vaulter Yelena Isinbayeva (who competed at her fourth Olympics), synchronized swimmer Anastasia Davydova, race walkers Olga Kaniskina and Valeriy Borchin, modern pentathlete Andrey Moiseyev and rhythmic gymnast Evgeniya Kanaeva. Among these champions, Isinbayeva, Davydova and Kanaeva managed to defend their Olympic titles for the second consecutive time in their events. Kanaeva became the first rhythmic gymnast to win back to back gold medal at the Olympics. Volleyballer Yevgeniya Estes became the first Russian athlete to compete in six Olympic games, although she first appeared as part of the Unified Team. Meanwhile, rifle shooters Artyom Khadjibekov and Sergei Kovalenko, and volleyballer Sergey Tetyukhin made their fifth Olympic appearance. Equestrian show jumper Vladimir Tuganov, at age 51, was the oldest athlete of the team, while relay swimmer Mariya Baklakova was the youngest at age 15.

Other notable Russian athletes featured NBA basketball players Andrei Kirilenko and Timofey Mozgov, high jumpers Ivan Ukhov and Anna Chicherova, US-based swimmers Vladimir Morozov and Arkady Vyatchanin, and gymnast and world individual all-around champion Aliya Mustafina. World number-one female tennis player Maria Sharapova, who competed at her first Olympics, became Russia's first female flag bearer at the opening ceremony.

| width=78% align=left valign=top |
The following is the list of number of competitors participating in the Games:

Archery

Russian athletes qualified a team of 3 through 2011 World Archery Championships.

Athletics

Russian athletes achieved qualifying standards in the following athletics events (up to a maximum of 3 athletes in each event at the 'A' Standard, and 1 at the 'B' Standard): 26 Russian track and field athletes failed doping tests in the aftermath of the London Olympics, and 11 medals were rescinded. On 1 May 2013, discus thrower Darya Pishchalnikova was stripped of her silver medal and received a 10-year ban by the International Olympic Committee for a positive doping test on oxandrolone. On January 30, 2015, 3000 m steeplechaser Yuliya Zaripova received a 2 years and 6 months ban from the Russian Anti-Doping Agency after a positive doping test for blood doping. Afterwards, it was that said Russia "sabotaged" the 2012 Olympics by allowing athletes who should have been banned for doping violations to compete in the London Olympics, with RUSADA covering up positive tests and punishing only those athletes who would have been banned anyway.
Key

Men
Track & road events

Field events

Combined events – Decathlon

Women
Track & road events

Field events

Combined events – Heptathlon

Badminton

Basketball

Russia's women team qualified for the event by winning the EuroBasket Women 2011. The men qualified through the world qualification tournament.
 Women's event – 1 team of 12 players
 Men's event – 1 team of 12 players.

Men's tournament

Roster

Group play

Quarter-final

Semifinal

Bronze medal game

Women's tournament

Roster

Group play

Quarterfinals

Semifinals

Bronze medal match

Boxing

Russia qualified boxers for the following events:

Men

Women

Canoeing

Slalom
Russia qualified boats for the following events:

Sprint
Russia qualified 15 athletes quota places through 2011 ICF Canoe Sprint World Championships held at Szeged, Hungary.

Men

Women

Qualification Legend: FA = Qualify to final (medal); FB = Qualify to final B (non-medal)

Cycling

Russia qualified cyclists for the following events:

Road

Men

Women

Track
Sprint

Team sprint

Pursuit

Keirin

Omnium

Mountain biking

Diving

Russia qualified a maximum of 7 divers from 2011 World Aquatics Championships in Shanghai. Russia also qualified another diver in the men's 10 m platform and the men's 10 m platform synchronised team at the 2012 Diving World Cup.

Men

Women

Equestrian

Eventing

Show jumping

Fencing

Russia qualified 15 fencers.

Men

Women

Gymnastics

Artistic
Men
Team

Individual finals

Women

Individual finals

Rhythmic

Trampoline

Handball

 Women's team event – 1 team of 14 players

Women's tournament

Group play

Quarterfinals

Judo 

Russia qualified 7 men and 5 women for the Olympics.

Men

Women

Modern pentathlon

Russia qualified two men and two women.

Rowing

Men

Women

Qualification Legend: FA=Final A (medal); FB=Final B (non-medal); FC=Final C (non-medal); FD=Final D (non-medal); FE=Final E (non-medal); FF=Final F (non-medal); SA/B=Semifinals A/B; SC/D=Semifinals C/D; SE/F=Semifinals E/F; QF=Quarterfinals; R=Repechage

Sailing

Russia qualified 1 boat for each of the following events:

Men

Women

M = Medal race; EL = Did not advance

Match racing

Shooting

Russia earned 24 quotas in shooting events:

Men

Women

Swimming

Russian swimmers achieved qualifying standards in the following events (up to a maximum of 2 swimmers in each event at the Olympic Qualifying Time (OQT), and 1 at the Olympic Selection Time (OST)):

Men

Women

Synchronized swimming

Russia qualified 9 quota places in synchronized swimming at the 2012 Olympics.

Table tennis

Russia qualified two athletes for singles table tennis events. Based on their world ranking as of 16 May 2011 Alexey Smirnov and Alexander Shibaev qualified for the men's event.

Taekwondo 

Russia ensured berths in the following events of taekwondo by reaching the top 3 of the 2011 WTF World Qualification Tournament. Russia also qualified in two more events in the European Championships.

Tennis

Men

Women

Mixed

Triathlon

Volleyball

Russia qualified a men's team and a women's team for the indoor tournaments.
 Men's team event – 1 team of 12 players
 Women's team event – 1 team of 12 players

Beach

Men's indoor tournament

Team roster

Group play

Quarterfinal

Semifinal

Final

Women's indoor tournament

Team roster

Group play

Quarterfinals

Water polo

 Women's team event – 1 team of 13 players

Women's tournament

Roster

Group play

Quarterfinals

5–8th place semifinals

Fifth place game

Weightlifting

Russia qualified 6 men and 4 women. Three of the medals that Russia initially won in weightlifting were stripped due to doping violations.
Men

Women

Wrestling 

Men's freestyle

Men's Greco-Roman

Women's freestyle

Russian doping scandal

Media attention began growing in December 2014 when German broadcaster ARD reported on state-sponsored doping in Russia, comparing it to doping in East Germany. In November 2015, the World Anti-Doping Agency (WADA) published a report, and the International Association of Athletics Federations (IAAF) suspended Russia indefinitely from world track and field events. The 335-page report, compiled following a nearly year-long investigation by a commission led by former anti-doping agency President Dick Pound, urged the IAAF to suspend Russia from competition, including the 2016 Summer Olympics. The report said Russia "sabotaged" the 2012 Olympics by allowing athletes who should have been banned for doping violations to compete in the London Games. It recommended the anti-doping agency impose lifetime suspensions for 10 Russian coaches and athletes, including women's 800-meters gold medalist Mariya Savinova. The United Kingdom Anti-Doping agency later assisted WADA with testing in Russia. In June 2016, they reported that they were unable to fully carry out their work and noted intimidation by armed Federal Security Service (FSB) agents.
After a Russian former lab director made allegations about the 2014 Winter Olympics in Sochi, WADA commissioned an independent investigation led by Richard McLaren. McLaren's investigation found corroborating evidence, concluding in a report published in July 2016 that the Ministry of Sport and the FSB had operated a "state-directed failsafe system" using a "disappearing positive [test] methodology" (DPM) from "at least late 2011 to August 2015".

References

Nations at the 2012 Summer Olympics
2012
Summer Olympics
Doping in Russia